Pascal Jampy (born 1 May 1973) is a French former professional rugby league footballer who played for Paris Saint-Germain and the Catalans Dragons in the Super League. He represented France in the 1995 and 2000 World Cups, and also on the 2001 tour of New Zealand and Papua New Guinea.

Jampy was a substitute in Catalans first ever Super League game - a 38–30 victory over Wigan Warriors. He played 13 games for the club before retiring at the end of the season.

References

1973 births
Living people
AS Saint Estève players
Catalans Dragons players
France national rugby league team captains
France national rugby league team players
French rugby league players
Paris Saint-Germain Rugby League players
Rugby league locks
Rugby league second-rows
XIII Catalan players